Unshattered is the seventh solo studio album by English musician Peter Murphy. It was released on 19 October 2004, through Viastar Records. Produced by Gardner Cole, the album features contributions from various musicians, including Jane's Addiction members Stephen Perkins and Eric Avery, Porno for Pyros guitarist Peter DiStefano, former Bauhaus drummer Kevin Haskins and Canadian composer Ned Bouhalassa.

Track listing

Personnel
 Peter Murphy - vocals, lyrics, arrangement

Other musicians
 Stephen Perkins - drums (1, 9, 10)
 Peter DiStefano - guitar (2, 9)
 Harry Gregson-Williams - programming (1); associate production (1)
 Ioannis Goudelis - accordion (1, 6) 
 Sheetal Bhagat - backing vocals (2, 3)
 Ned Bouhalassa - programming (8, 10)
 Eric Avery - bass (10)
 Kevin Haskins - drums (9)
 Deon Estus - bass (3, 4, 7)
 Ramy Antoun - drums (3-8)
 Tim Pierce - guitar (1, 5, 6, 8–10)
 Paul Statham - programming (2-5, 7, 11); associate production (2-4, 7)

Technical personnel
 Gardner Cole - production; engineering (3, 4, 6–8); keyboards (2-5, 7, 8, 10, 11); guitar (4, 11); bass (6, 8, 11); drums (11); piano (6); bongo (10)
 Chauncey Gardner - engineering
 Bo Caldwell - assistant engineering
 Simeon Spiegel - engineering
 Daniel Cinelli - engineering (2, 5, 10, 11)
 Doug DeAngelis - engineering (9)
 Lisa Melanson - management
 Bruno Harvey - management
 Louisa Dery - management
 Howie Weinberg - mastering
 John Potoker - mixing
 Koray Birand - photography
 Orkan Telhan - graphic design

References

External links
 

Peter Murphy (musician) albums
2004 albums